Darwiniothamnus lancifolius is a species of flowering plant in the family Asteraceae.
It is found only in the Galápagos Islands.

References

lancifolius
Flora of the Galápagos Islands
Near threatened plants
Taxonomy articles created by Polbot